The following is a list of the 184 communes of the Val-d'Oise department of France.

The communes cooperate in the following intercommunalities (as of 2020):
Métropole du Grand Paris (partly)
Communauté d'agglomération de Cergy-Pontoise (partly)
Communauté d'agglomération Plaine Vallée
Communauté d'agglomération Roissy Pays de France (partly)
Communauté d'agglomération Saint Germain Boucles de Seine (partly)
Communauté d'agglomération Val Parisis
Communauté de communes Carnelle Pays-de-France
Communauté de communes du Haut Val d'Oise
Communauté de communes Sausseron Impressionnistes
Communauté de communes de la Vallée de l'Oise et des Trois Forêts
Communauté de communes Vexin Centre
Communauté de communes du Vexin-Val de Seine

References

Val-d'Oise